Lamut, officially the Municipality of Lamut  is a 4th class municipality in the province of Ifugao, Philippines. According to the 2020 census, it has a population of 26,235 people.

Lamut has the following schools: Lamut Central School, San Francisco High School, and Ifugao State University (formerly Ifugao State College of Agriculture and Forestry or ISCAF).

History
In 1959, the barrios of Lamut, Mabatobato, Lawig, Panopdopan, Magulon, Peiza, Payawan, Nayon, Halog, Pulaan, Dilan, Pangka, Hapid, Bulao, Allupapan, Pugol and Salamagui of the municipal district of Kiangan were separated from the said municipal district and constituted into the municipal district of Lamut. It was then composed of 4 barangays, namely: Mabatobato, Payawan, Nayon and Panopdopan.

The first appointed municipal mayor was Guinid Tuguinay who was later replaced by Alberto Puguon through a formal election held in November 1967, to December 1963. From January 1964 to December 1967, the municipal mayor was Alberto Bunoan, Sr. He was succeeded by Angelito Guinid from January 1968 to November 24, 1976, who was in turn succeeded by Gregorio Kitong who was appointed as municipal mayor. Kitong served until January 1986. When Corazon C. Aquino became the president, she appointed lady lawyer Lynda Bongyo-Chaguile as the O.I.C. mayor of Lamut and continued to serve until 1998. Lynda Chaguile was the first woman to serve and be elected as mayor in the municipality of Lamut and in the province.

Geography

Barangays
Lamut is politically subdivided into 18 barangays. These barangays are headed by elected officials: Barangay Captain, Barangay Council, whose members are called Barangay Councilors. All are elected every three years.

Climate

Demographics

Economy

Government
Lamut, belonging to the lone congressional district of the province of Ifugao, is governed by a mayor designated as its local chief executive and by a municipal council as its legislative body in accordance with the Local Government Code. The mayor, vice mayor, and the councilors are elected directly by the people through an election which is being held every three years.

Elected officials

References

External links

lamut.gov.ph
 [ Philippine Standard Geographic Code]
Philippine Census Information
Local Governance Performance Management System

Municipalities of Ifugao